Dušan Mileusnić (born 10 April 1984 in Belgrade) is a professional Serbian footballer currently plays for Novigrad.

Career 
Mileusnić began his career by FK BASK and moved 2010 to Vasas SC
On 28 February 2010, he signed for Hungarian club Vasas SC. In 2013, he signed for the Treća HNL Zapad side Novigrad.

External links
 HLSZ 

1984 births
Living people
Footballers from Belgrade
Serbian footballers
Association football defenders
FK BASK players
Vasas SC players
NK Novigrad players
Serbian expatriate footballers
Expatriate footballers in Hungary
Serbian expatriate sportspeople in Hungary